Christian Benbennek (born 9 November 1972) is a German football coach who was the head coach of BFC Dynamo.

Career
Benbennek joined VfL Wolfsburg as a youth coach in 1999, and spent ten years with the club, managing the reserve team from 2005 to 2007. In 2009, he moved to Wolfsburg's neighbours Eintracht Braunschweig, where he also served as reserve team manager for two years, before being replaced by Henning Bürger. After a year serving as a scout for Eintracht, he was surprisingly appointed as manager of 3. Liga side SV Babelsberg 03 at the beginning of the 2012–13 season, replacing Dietmar Demuth. He was sacked from the role in April 2013 with the club in danger of relegation. He took over as TSV Havelse manager in July 2013.

Benbennek joined Alemannia Aachen in May 2015. He was fired in December 2015. In May 2016, Benbennek took over as manager of Austrian Football Bundesliga club SV Ried.

On 7 April 2022 he was fired as the head coach of BFC Dynamo.

References

External links

1972 births
Living people
People from Heidekreis
German football managers
German expatriate football managers
Expatriate football managers in Austria
Eintracht Braunschweig non-playing staff
SV Babelsberg 03 managers
TSV Havelse managers
Alemannia Aachen managers
SV Ried managers
Berliner FC Dynamo managers
3. Liga managers